The dinosaur renaissance was a small-scale scientific revolution that started in the late 1960s and led to renewed academic and popular interest in dinosaurs. It was sparked by new discoveries and research indicating that dinosaurs may have been active and warm-blooded animals, rather than cold-blooded and sluggish as had been the prevailing view and description during the first half of the twentieth century.

The new view of dinosaurs was championed by John Ostrom, who argued that birds evolved from coelurosaurian dinosaurs, and particularly Robert Bakker who argued passionately that dinosaurs were warm-blooded in a way similar to modern mammals and birds. Bakker frequently portrayed his ideas as a renaissance of those popular in the late nineteenth century, referring to the period in between the Dinosaur Wars and the dinosaur renaissance as "the dinosaur doldrums".

The dinosaur renaissance led to a profound shift in thinking on nearly all aspects of dinosaur biology, including physiology, evolution, behaviour, ecology and extinction. It also led to many depictions of dinosaurs in popular culture.

Dinosaurs and the origin of birds 

In the mid and latter parts of the nineteenth century, many scientists thought there was a close relationship between birds and dinosaurs—and that dinosaurs represented an intermediate stage between "reptiles" and birds.

Shortly after the 1859 publication of Charles Darwin's The Origin of Species, British biologist and evolution-defender Thomas Henry Huxley proposed that birds were descendants of dinosaurs. He cited skeletal similarities, particularly among dinosaurs, the "first bird"—Archaeopteryx—and modern birds.

However, in 1926, Gerhard Heilmann wrote his influential book The Origin of Birds, in which he dismissed the dinosaur–bird link, based on the dinosaurs' supposed lack of a furcula. Thereafter, the accepted hypothesis was that birds evolved from crocodylomorph and thecodont ancestors, rather than from dinosaurs. This removed dinosaurs from a central role in debates about the origin of living species, and may have contributed to the decline of academic interest in dinosaur evolution.

This situation persisted until 1964, when John Ostrom discovered a small carnivorous dinosaur which he named Deinonychus antirrhopus, a theropod whose skeletal resemblance to birds seemed unmistakable. This led Ostrom to argue that Huxley had been right, and that birds had indeed evolved from dinosaurs. Although it was Deinonychus that inspired Ostrom to connect birds with dinosaurs, very similar birdlike dinosaurs, such as Velociraptor, had been known for many decades, but no connection had been made. After Ostrom's discoveries, the idea that birds are dinosaurs gained support among palaeontologists, and today it is almost universally accepted. Newer methods, such as cladistics, and the discovery of several feathered dinosaurs have helped confirm the relationship.

The relationship between non-avian dinosaurs and avian dinosaurs, birds, has led to considerable interest in dinosaur—particularly theropod—phylogeny, which is now far better understood.

Dinosaur monophyly 

Initially, dinosaurs were thought to be a monophyletic group, comprising animals with a common ancestor not shared by other reptiles. However, Harry Seeley disagreed with this interpretation, and split the Dinosauria into two orders, the Saurischia ("lizard-hipped") and the Ornithischia ("bird-hipped"), which were seen as members of the Archosauria with no special relationship to each other. As such, the Dinosauria was no longer seen as a scientific grouping, and "dinosaur" was reduced to being a popular term, without scientific meaning. This became the standard interpretation throughout much of the twentieth century.

This changed in 1974, when Bakker and Peter Galton published a paper in Nature, arguing that not only were dinosaurs a natural monophyletic group, but that they should be raised to the status of a new class, which would also contain birds. Although initially this revival of dinosaur monophyly was controversial, the idea did gain acceptance, and since the rise of cladistic methodology, it has been nearly universally supported. The raising of the Dinosauria to class rank found less support, perhaps largely due to  increasing use of phylogenetic taxonomy among vertebrate palaeontologists, in which ranks are entirely abandoned.

Warm-bloodedness and activity levels 

In a series of scientific papers, books, and popular articles in the 1970s and 1980s, beginning with his 1968 paper "The superiority of dinosaurs", Robert Bakker argued strenuously that dinosaurs were warm-blooded and active animals, capable of sustained periods of high activity. In most of his writings Bakker framed his arguments as new evidence leading to a revival of ideas popular in the late 19th century, frequently referring to an ongoing "dinosaur renaissance". He used a variety of anatomical and statistical arguments to defend his case, the methodology of which was fiercely debated among scientists.

These debates sparked interest in new methods for ascertaining the palaeobiology of extinct animals, such as bone histology, which have been successfully applied to determining the growth-rates of many dinosaurs.

Today, it is generally thought that many or perhaps all dinosaurs had higher metabolic rates than living reptiles, but also that the situation is more complex and varied than Bakker originally proposed. For example, while smaller dinosaurs may have been true endotherms, the larger forms could have been inertial homeotherms, or many dinosaurs could have had intermediate metabolic rates.

New theories on dinosaur behaviour 
The late 1960s  also saw several new theories on the way dinosaurs behaved, often involving sophisticated social behaviour.

On the basis of trackways, Bakker argued that sauropod dinosaurs moved in structured herds, with the adults surrounding the juveniles in a protective ring. However, shortly afterwards this particular interpretation was challenged by Ostrom among others, although the venerable dinosaur track expert Roland T. Bird apparently agreed with Bakker.

The first rigorous study of dinosaur nesting behaviour came in the late 1970s, when palaeontologist Jack Horner showed that the duckbilled dinosaur Maiasaura cared for its young.

Changing portrayal of dinosaurs 
The dinosaur renaissance changed not only scientific ideas about dinosaurs, but also their portrayal by artists. Bakker, himself a talented artist, often illustrated his ideas in a lively fashion. Indeed, Bakker's illustration of Deinonychus, made for Ostrom's 1969 description, has become one of the most recognisable and iconic of dinosaur restorations.

During the 1970s, restorations of dinosaurs shifted from being lizard-like, to being more mammal- and bird-like. Artists started to show dinosaurs in more active poses, and incorporating newer theories of dinosaur locomotion and behaviour. Tails that were widely shown as having been dragged behind a creature, were now shown uplifted, in order to balance the huge bodies while active.

Besides Bakker, key artists in this "new wave" were first Mark Hallett, Gregory S. Paul in the 1970s, and during the 1980s Doug Henderson and John Gurche.

Gregory Paul in particular defended and expanded on Bakker's ideas on dinosaur anatomy. He expounded a rigorous and detailed approach to dinosaur restoration, in which he often criticised the errors of the traditionalist approach. He also produced a large number of restorations showing small dinosaurs with feathers, and defended the idea in a number of articles and his book Predatory Dinosaurs of the World. His view was proven largely correct in the late 1990s with the discovery of several feathered dinosaurs. Paul's ideas and style have had a significant impact on dinosaur art, and likely will continue to do so for some time.

New extinction theories, the meteor impact 

Traditionally paleontology had followed geology in preferring uniformitarian mechanisms, despite the promotion by Eugene Merle Shoemaker of the importance of catastrophic impacts. During the renaissance period Walter Alvarez and others found iridium in the Cretaceous–Tertiary boundary layer. Also the Chicxulub Crater, was identified and determined to be due to a meteor impact. These discoveries led to the acceptance and popularisation of the idea that the extinction had been caused by an impact event. This in turn undermined the assumption that dinosaurs had become extinct because they were inferior to mammals. Instead it suggested they had fallen prey to a random event which no large animal could have survived.

Cultural impacts 

Bakker's non-technical articles and books, particularly The Dinosaur Heresies, have contributed significantly to the popularization of dinosaur science.

The 1988 film The Land Before Time was one of the first cinematic portrayals of theropods in the correct horizontal pose, although the tripod pose was used more often.

The 1993 film version of Jurassic Park was perhaps the most significant event in raising public awareness of dinosaur renaissance theories. For the first time in a major film, dinosaurs were portrayed as intelligent, agile, warm-blooded animals, rather than lumbering monsters more common to older films. Jack Horner was a consultant, and the artwork of Gregory Paul, Mark Hallett, Doug Henderson, and John Gurche were used in pre-production. While the dinosaurs eventually shown in the films had various anatomical inaccuracies, all four of these artists are in the on-screen credits as "Dinosaur Specialists". Bakker himself was not consulted or credited, but his research is referenced by one of the characters in the film, and a Bakker look-alike appears in the sequel The Lost World.

See also

List of U.S. state birds
List of U.S. state dinosaurs
Paleoart and Paleoartists

Notes and references

Further reading 

Renaissance
History of paleontology
Dinosaurs in popular culture